Ali Hadi Mohammed Al-Bulaihi (born 21 November 1989) is a Saudi football player who plays as a defender for Saudi Professional League club Al-Hilal, and for the Saudi Arabia national football team.

Club career
Al-Bulaihi started his career at Al-Amal where he spent three years before joining Al-Nahda in 2014. On 23 July 2015, Al Bulaihi joined Al-Fateh.

Al-Hilal
On 21 June 2017, Al-Hilal signed Al Bulaihi on a free transfer. He signed a three-year contract with the club.

International career
In June 2018 he was named in Saudi Arabia’s squad for the 2018 FIFA World Cup in Russia, playing against Uruguay.

Career statistics

Club

International
Statistics accurate as of match played 30 November 2022.

Honours

Al Hilal
 Saudi Professional League: 2017–18, 2019–20, 2020–21, 2021–22
 Kings Cup: 2019–20
 Saudi Super Cup: 2018, 2021
 AFC Champions League: 2019, 2021

References

External links

1989 births
Living people
Saudi Arabian footballers
Association football defenders
Al-Bukayriyah FC players
Al-Nahda Club (Saudi Arabia) players
Al-Fateh SC players
Al Hilal SFC players
People from Najran
Saudi First Division League players
Saudi Professional League players
Saudi Fourth Division players
2019 AFC Asian Cup players
2018 FIFA World Cup players
Saudi Arabia international footballers
2022 FIFA World Cup players